Castle in the Ground is a 2019 Canadian-American drama film, written and directed by Joey Klein. The film explores a teenager's developing opioid addiction after the death of his terminally ill mother. It stars Alex Wolff, Imogen Poots, Tom Cullen, Keir Gilchrist and Neve Campbell.

It had its world premiere at the 2019 Toronto International Film Festival on September 5, 2019. It is scheduled to be released in the United States and Canada on May 15, 2020, by Gravitas Ventures and Pacific Northwest Pictures.

Cast

 Alex Wolff as Henry Fine
 Imogen Poots as Ana
 Tom Cullen as Jimmy
 Kiowa Gordon as Stevie
 Keir Gilchrist as Polo Boy
 Neve Campbell as Rebecca Fine

Production
In March 2019, it was announced Alex Wolff, Imogen Poots, Neve Campbell, Keir Gilchrist and Tom Cullen had joined the cast of the film, with Klein directing.

Release
It had its world premiere at the 2019 Toronto International Film Festival on September 5, 2019. Shortly after, Gravitas Ventures acquired U.S. distribution rights to the film and set it for a May 15, 2020, release.

References

External links
 
 
 Castle in the Ground at Library and Archives Canada

2019 films
English-language Canadian films
Canadian drama films
American drama films
Films about drugs
Films shot in Greater Sudbury
Films directed by Joey Klein
Films set in Northern Ontario
Greater Sudbury in fiction
2010s English-language films
2010s American films
2010s Canadian films